Mohamed Zrida (born 1 February 1999) is a Moroccan professional footballer who plays as a midfielder for Raja CA.

Honours
Raja CA
 Botola: 2019–20;  runner-up: 2020-21, 2021-22
 Arab Club Champions Cup: 2019–20
 CAF Confederation Cup: 2020–21
 CAF Super Cup runner-up: 2021

References

External links
 

1999 births
Living people
Moroccan footballers
Footballers from Casablanca
Raja CA players
Association football midfielders